Elisabetta Spinelli (born March 24, 1965) is an Italian voice actress who contributes to voicing characters in cartoons, anime and more content.

She voices Mela in the animated series Puppy in My Pocket: Adventures in Pocketville. She was also known for voicing Nefertari Vivi in the Italian-language version of One Piece until her role was given to fellow voice actress Alessandra Karpoff. She is also known for voicing in Italian-language Haruka Uchiha in Naruto, Chi Chi in Dragon Ball and Usagi Tsukino in Sailor Moon.

She works at Merak Film, Studio Asci and other dubbing studios in Italy.

Filmography

Anime and animation
 Nefertari Vivi (first voice) in One Piece
 Haruka Uchiha in Naruto 
 Haruka Uchiha in Naruto Shippuden 
 Chi Chi in Dragon Ball
 Chi Chi in Dragon Ball Z
 Chi Chi in Dragon Ball GT
 Chi Chi in Dragon Ball Super
 Winry Rockbell in Fullmetal Alchemist
 Winry Rockbell in Fullmetal Alchemist: Brotherhood
 Winry Rockbell in Fullmetal Alchemist the Movie: Conqueror of Shamballa
 Mela in Puppy in My Pocket: Adventures in Pocketville
 Ginevra in Angel's Friends
 Lucia Nanami in Mermaid Melody Pichi Pichi Pitch
 Sailor Moon in Sailor Moon
 Marie (character) in E' un po' magia per Terry e Maggie
 Lala in Magical DoReMi
 Frieda the Foot in Oobi
 Elyon Brown in W.I.T.C.H.
 Pippi Longstocking in Pippi Longstocking
 Angol Mois in Sgt. Frog
 Sloth in Almost Naked Animals
 Penny in Inspector Gadget (second edition)
 Ned in Ozie Boo!
 Lady Deathstrike in X-Men
 Rue in Tomodachi Life: The TV Series
 Runo Misaki in Bakugan Battle Brawlers
 Agent Heather in Gadget Boy & Heather
 Shizuka Kawai in Yu-Gi-Oh! Duel Monsters
 Lettuce Midorikawa in Tokyo Mew Mew
 Princess in Jura Tripper
 Marielle Rodriguez in Sarah Lee Jones
 Shigure in Ninja Scroll: The Series
 Ayu Tateishi in Ultra Maniac
 Eliza Thomas in Kon'nichiwa Anne: Before Green Gables
 Mito in Hunter x Hunter
 Cassandra/Cassy in Ultimate Book of Spells
 Veronica in Maya & Miguel
 Share Bear in Care Bears: Adventures in Care-a-lot
 Nan Harding in Little Women II: Jo's Boys
 Jenny Wakeman in My Life as an Adult Android
 Cathy in Jeanie with the Light Brown Hair
 Lulu in Gaiking: Legend of Daiku-Maryu
 Ursa in Bear in the Big Blue House
 Cleo in Bratz
 Lulu de Morcerf Yamamoto in Shugo Chara!
 Cinderella in Cinderella Monogatari
 Kei in Iria: Zeiram the Animation
 Marie Milgraine Diamas (Second voice) in Miracle Girls
 Rena Uzuki in Najica Blitz Tactics
 Angeletta in Romeo's Blue Skies
 Wilhelmina in Pokémon
 Carol in Pokémon: The Movie 2000
 Lady Rin in Pokémon: Lucario and the Mystery of Mew
 Wendy Darling in Peter Pan and the Pirates
 Seira Mimori in Saint Tail
 Lasty Farson/Angel Rabbie in Tenbatsu! Angel Rabbie
 Kyla in Delgo
 Amanda Carey in Hurricanes
 Emily in Dreamkix
 Kitty Katswell in T.U.F.F. Puppy
 Sassy Saddles in My Little Pony: Friendship Is Magic

Live action
 June Carter Cash in Walk the Line
 Ángela Vidal in REC
 Sam in Blue's Clues
 Tiffany Monaco in Dr. Dolittle Million Dollar Mutts
 Trudy Kavanagh in S. Darko
 and others

Video games
 TimeShift
 Keepsake

References

External links
 

Living people
Actresses from Milan
Italian voice actresses
Italian voice directors
1965 births